The Leicestershire Royal Horse Artillery was a Territorial Force Royal Horse Artillery battery that was formed in Leicestershire in 1908.  It saw active service during the First World War in Egypt and Palestine from 1916 to 1918, initially with ANZAC Mounted Division before joining the Yeomanry Mounted Division and 1st Mounted / 4th Cavalry Division.  A second line battery, 2/1st Leicestershire RHA, served on the Western Front with the 63rd (Royal Naval) Division from 1916 to 1918.  Post-war, it was reconstituted as a Royal Field Artillery battery.

History

Formation
The Territorial Force (TF) was formed on 1 April 1908 following the enactment of the Territorial and Reserve Forces Act 1907 (7 Edw.7, c.9) which combined and re-organised the old Volunteer Force, the Honourable Artillery Company and the Yeomanry.  On formation, the TF contained 14 infantry divisions and 14 mounted yeomanry brigades. Each yeomanry brigade included a horse artillery battery and an ammunition column.

On 18 March 1908, Leicestershire Royal Horse Artillery (Territorial Force) was proposed as a new unit and it was recognized by the Army Council on 21 July 1908 (and the ammunition column on 29 July 1908). The unit consisted of
Battery HQ at No.1 Magazine Square, Leicester
Leicestershire Battery at Leicester
North Midland Mounted Brigade Ammunition Column also at Leicester 
The battery was equipped with four Ehrhardt 15-pounder guns and allocated as artillery support to the North Midland Mounted Brigade.

First World War

In accordance with the Territorial and Reserve Forces Act 1907 (7 Edw.7, c.9) which brought the Territorial Force into being, the TF was intended to be a home defence force for service during wartime and members could not be compelled to serve outside the country. However, on the outbreak of war on 4 August 1914, many members volunteered for Imperial Service.  Therefore, TF units were split into 1st Line (liable for overseas service) and 2nd Line (home service for those unable or unwilling to serve overseas) units.  2nd Line units performed the home defence role, although in fact most of these were also posted abroad in due course.

1/1st Leicestershire
The battery was embodied with the North Midland Mounted Brigade and assigned to Third Army of the Central Force. It moved to Norfolk and joined 1st Mounted Division in September 1914 replacing the Nottinghamshire and Derbyshire Mounted Brigade. The brigade remained with 1st Mounted Division until October 1915 when it departed (as a mounted formation) for the Mediterranean. The battery remained in the United Kingdom attached to 2/1st North Midland Mounted Brigade, still with 1st Mounted Division.  In February 1916 the battery (and its ammunition column) departed Southampton and disembarked at Alexandria in Egypt on 25 February.

Service with III Brigade

III Brigade, Royal Horse Artillery (T.F.) was formed in April 1916 in the Egyptian Expeditionary Force with the Somerset and Leicestershire Batteries, RHA.  It was assigned to the ANZAC Mounted Division to provide artillery support. In practice, the batteries were permanently attached to the mounted brigades of the division and Leicestershire RHA joined the Australian 1st Light Horse Brigade.

The battery initially served with the ANZAC Mounted Division in the Sinai and Palestine Campaign.  With the division, it saw action at the Battle of Romani (414 August 1916) as part of No. 3 Section, Suez Canal Defences.  This saw the repulse of the final Turkish attempt to cut the Suez Canal.

The division then joined the Desert Column and with it took part in the advance across the Sinai.  It fought at the Battle of Magdhaba (23 December 1916) and the Battle of Rafah (9 January 1917). The batteries were then re-equipped with four 18 pounders each before taking part in the First (2627 March 1917) and Second Battles of Gaza (1719 April 1917).

In June 1917, the Desert Column was reorganised from two mounted divisions of four brigades each (ANZAC and Imperial Mounted Divisions) to three mounted divisions of three brigades each (ANZAC, AustralianImperial Mounted Division renamedand the new Yeomanry Mounted Division). Consequently, the 22nd Mounted Brigade was transferred from the ANZAC to the Yeomanry Mounted Division on 6 July 1917.  With a reduction to three brigades, there was a corresponding reduction in the artillery to three batteries.  The Leicestershire Battery departed on 20 June to join XX Brigade, RHA (T.F.) in the Yeomanry Mounted Division.

Service with XX Brigade
Leicestershire, RHA (by now equipped with four 13 pounders) transferred from ANZAC Mounted Division on 20 June 1916 and joined XX Brigade RHA on 5 July 1917 where it joined the Hampshire and Berkshire Batteries. The battery remained with the division when it was restructured and indianized as the 1st Mounted Division (from 24 April 1918) and later renamed as 4th Cavalry Division (23 July 1918).

During its time with the Yeomanry Mounted Division, the division served as part of the Egyptian Expeditionary Force in Palestine.  From 31 October it took part in the Third Battle of Gaza, including the Battle of Beersheba (in GHQ Reserve) and the Capture of the Sheria Position under the Desert Mounted Corps (DMC).  Still with the DMC, it took part in the Battle of Mughar Ridge on 13 and 14 November and the Battle of Nebi Samwil from 17 to 24 November.  From 27 to 29 November, it withstood the Turkish counter-attacks during the Capture of Jerusalem.

Once the division was restructured and renamed, it served with the Desert Mounted Corps for the rest of the war, taking part in the Second Transjordan Raid (30 April to 4 May 1918) and the Final Offensive, in particular the Battle of Megiddo (19 to 25 September) and the Capture of Damascus (1 October).

The 4th Cavalry Division remained in Palestine on occupation duties after the end of the war.  However, demobilization began immediately and most of the British war time units had left by May 1919. The Leicestershire Battery were reduced to cadre in Egypt on 14 October 1919.

2/1st Leicestershire

Leicestershire RHA formed a 2nd line in 1915 and given a fractional designation as 2/1st Leicestershire Battery, RHA. It joined the 2/1st North Midland Mounted Brigade and with the brigade, joined 1st Mounted Division in October 1915 to replace the 1st line North Midland Mounted Brigade.

The pre-war Territorial Force infantry divisions were generally supported by four field artillery brigades.  These were numbered I, II, III and IV within each division and consisted of three gun brigades (each of three batteries, equipped with four 15-pounder guns) and a howitzer brigade (two batteries of four 5" howitzers). Artillery for 2nd Line divisions were formed in a similar manner, with a fractional designation, for example the artillery for the 63rd (2nd Northumberland) Division consisted of 2/I Northumberland Brigade, RFA (with 2/1st, 2/2nd and 2/3rd Northumberland Batteries, RFA), 2/II Northumberland Brigade, RFA (with 2/1st, 2/2nd and 2/3rd East Riding Batteries, RFA), 2/III Northumberland Brigade, RFA (with 2/1st, 2/2nd and 2/3rd Durham Batteries, RFA) and 2/IV Northumberland (Howitzer) Brigade, RFA (with 2/4th and 2/5th Durham (Howitzer) Batteries, RFA).

Between 8 and 22 May 1916, the artillery of 63rd (2nd Northumberland) Division was reorganized.  The brigades were numbered (CCCXV, CCCXVI, CCCXVII, and CCCXVIII) and the batteries lettered (so 2/1st Northumberland Battery became A Battery, CCCXV Brigade).  The howitzer batteries of CCCXVIII Brigade were transferred to CCCXV and CCCXVI brigades and the brigade was reformed with three gun batteries. 2/1st Leicestershire RHA joined as A Battery and 2/1st Somerset RHA as B Battery. The batteries each consisted of four 18 pounders.

On 2 July 1916, the 63rd (2nd Northumberland) Division's artillery left for France where it joined the Royal Naval Division.  On 18 July, A (Howitzer) Battery of XXCCIII Brigade (formerly 1/4th Kent (Howitzer) Battery of 1/IV Home Counties (Howitzer) Brigade) joined the brigade as D (Howitzer) Battery.  With the breakup of XXCCIII Brigade, CCCXVIII Brigade was redesignated XXCCIII Brigade on 31 July.  On 31 August, the batteries of the brigade were made up to 6 guns apiece and the battery now consisted of six 18 pounders.

The battery, and the brigade, served with 63rd (Royal Naval) Division for the rest of the war on the Western Front.  With the division, it took part in the Battle of the Ancre (1315 November 1916), Operations on the Ancre (20 January27 February 1917) and Battle of Miraumont (17 and 18 February).  It then took part in the Battles of Arras, notably the Second Battle of the Scarpe (23 and 24 April) and the Battle of Arleux (28 and 29 April).  At the end of 1917, it took part in the Third Battle of Ypres notably the Second Battle of Passchendaele (26 October5 November) and Welch Ridge (30 and 31 December).

In 1918, the division faced the German offensive in the First Battles of the Somme: Battle of St. Quentin (2123 March), First Battle of Bapaume (24 and 25 March), and the Battle of the Ancre (5 April).  Then followed the advance to victory: the Battle of Albert (2123 August), Battle of Drocourt-Quéant Line (2 and 3 September), Battle of the Canal du Nord (27 September1 October), Battle of Cambrai and Capture of Niergnies (both on 8 October) and the Passage of the Grande Honnelle (7 November).

At the Armistice, the battery (six 18 pounders) was still with CCXXIII Brigade, RFA serving with 63rd (Royal Naval) Division. The division was not selected to form part of the Army of Occupation and by April 1919 it had been disbanded.

Post war
The Leicestershire RHA was not reconstituted until 7 February 1920 when it formed a battery (later numbered 239th) in 1st North Midland Brigade, RFA (later 60th (North Midland) Field Regiment, RA) and ceased to be a Royal Horse Artillery battery. The Nottinghamshire RHA also joined the brigade as 240th Battery. In 1938 these two batteries were detached from 60th (NM) Field Regiment (as it had become) to form a separate 115th (North Midland) Field Regiment, RA, which saw service in the Battle of France and Burma campaign in World War II. In 1950 it was amalgamated into 350 (South Notts Hussars Yeomanry) Heavy Regiment, RA.

See also

 List of Territorial Force horse artillery batteries 1908

Notes

References

Bibliography
 
 
 
 
 
 
 Norman E.H. Litchfield, The Territorial Artillery 1908–1988 (Their Lineage, Uniforms and Badges), Nottingham: Sherwood Press, 1992, .

External links
The Royal Horse Artillery on The Long, Long Trail
The Great War Royal Horse Artillery

Royal Horse Artillery batteries
Artillery units and formations of World War I
Military units and formations established in 1908
Military units and formations disestablished in 1919
Military units and formations in Leicestershire
Military units and formations in Leicester
1908 establishments in the United Kingdom